Richard Osborne, (born 12 December 1989) is a British singer/songwriter, from Ipswich, England. He is publicly known under the moniker of Osborne.

Early life and career
Richard comes from a musical background, his father is an acclaimed bass player and his roots are deeply embedded in the R&B and Soul genre.

Richard has collaborated with recording artists such as English grime artist Scorcher, and Grammy award-winning artist Dice Raw.

In 2013, he attended an annual master class for musicians, at the BBC Maida Vale Studios in London, and is currently releasing music on his own imprint 'LNT'.

In September, 2017, Osborne released his debut independent single, "Complete". A remixed version by Canadian-based producer Lucky Rose was released by new label So, Let's Talk Ltd as a single on March 29, 2018. On 20 November 2018, East Anglian Daily Times, a British local newspaper for Suffolk and Essex, ran an article on the remix when it reached 2.3 million streams. In June 2019, the remix reached 10 million streams on Spotify alone.

Releases
"Complete" - Single (2017)
"Complete" (Lucky Rose Remix) - Single (2018)
"Ocean Floor" - Single (2019)
"Feel The Same" - Single (2020)

References

1989 births
Living people
Musicians from Ipswich
21st-century British singers
21st-century British male singers
Musicians from Suffolk